Slim is a 1937 American romantic drama film directed by Ray Enright and starring Pat O'Brien and Henry Fonda. It is sometimes (incorrectly) called Slim the Lineman. The picture is a film adaptation of the 1934 novel Slim  by William Wister Haines, which concerns linemen in the electric power industry. The supporting cast features Margaret Lindsay and Jane Wyman.

Plot
Slim, a farmer from southeastern Ohio, becomes fascinated by a crew of linemen erecting transmission towers across his uncle and aunt's property.  He asks Pop (J. Farrell MacDonald) for a job, but there are no openings. When a man is fired, however, Red (Pat O'Brien), Pop's best lineman, takes a liking to Slim and persuades Pop to give him a chance as a "grunt", an assistant on the ground who sends up tools and parts. Red and Stumpy (Stuart Erwin), another grunt, teach Slim what he needs to know.

Slim wins the respect of Red and Pop when he spots cheating during a poker game and pitches in during the ensuing brawl. When hungover lineman Wyatt Ranstead falls and is killed, Slim is promoted to lineman. The company sends a vice president to investigate the death. To save Pop's job, Red deliberately antagonizes the executive and is fired. Slim gets himself dismissed out of loyalty, and the two go on the road.

They head to Chicago to see Red's girlfriend, Cally (Margaret Lindsay) a nurse. The three set out to have a good time (though Red insists on paying for everything). Slim finds himself falling for Cally, and she for him. When Red's money runs out, he and Slim head off to New Mexico for work.

Red knows and dislikes one of their fellow linemen, Wilcox (Joe Sawyer). When Red is later offered the job of foreman at another camp, he initially turns it down, but changes his mind when Slim offers to be his "straw boss" (assistant).   Wilcox, who had been hoping for the promotion himself, tries to sabotage Red's rope, but Slim stops him. Later, on the ground, Wilcox pulls out a knife and stabs Slim. While Slim is recovering in the hospital, Cally comes to nurse him. They admit they love each other and tell Red they are going to get married. When Slim is offered stable, safe maintenance work, Cally accepts for him. Slim, however, refuses to give up his dangerous profession, and when Pop sends for Red, goes with him.

They arrive during a terrible blizzard, and are called out to a substation to restore power, even though there are "hot" wires all around. Red and another man fall to their deaths when a rope breaks in a block and tackle while pulling up a transmission line. Cally joins Slim and once again tries to talk him out of line work. When Slim heads back out into the snow to complete the job, Cally accepts his decision, telling him, "I'll be waiting for you."

Cast
Pat O'Brien as	Red Blayd
Henry Fonda as Slim
Margaret Lindsay as Cally
Stuart Erwin as Stumpy
J. Farrell MacDonald as Pop
Dick Purcell as Tom
Joe Sawyer as Wilcox (as Joseph Sawyer)
Craig Reynolds as Gambler
John Litel as Wyatt Ranstead
Jane Wyman as Stumpy's Girl
Harland Tucker as Lafe Garrettson (as Harlan Tucker)
Joe King as Steve (as Joseph King)
Carlyle Moore, Jr. as Al
Archie Robbins as Joe (as James Robbins)
Henry Otho as Mitch
Dick Wessel as Ed (as Dick Wessell)
Max Wagner as Griff
Ben Hendricks, Jr. as Kelly (as Ben Hendricks)
Alonzo Price as Gambler
Maidel Turner as Mrs. Johnson
Walter Miller as Sam

See also
 Manpower, a 1941 film also about linemen in a romantic triangle starring Edward G. Robinson, Marlene Dietrich and George Raft.

External links

 
 

1937 films
American romantic drama films
American black-and-white films
1930s English-language films
Films based on American novels
Films directed by Ray Enright
Films produced by Samuel Bischoff
1937 romantic drama films
Warner Bros. films
1930s American films